Mohammad Aslam may refer to:

Cricket
 Mohammad Aslam (Balochistan cricketer) (born 1987), Pakistani cricketer
 Mohammad Aslam (Emirati cricketer) (born 1961)
 Mohammad Aslam (Omani cricketer) (born 1975), Pakistan-born cricketer for Oman
 Mohammad Aslam (Peshawar cricketer) (born 1979), Pakistani cricketer
 Mohammad Aslam (Punjab cricketer) (born 1975), Pakistani cricketer
 Mohammad Aslam Khokhar (1920–2011), Pakistani cricketer 
 Mohammed Aslam (cricketer) (born 1990), Sri Lankan cricketer
 Mohammad Aslam (umpire) (born 1949), Pakistani cricket umpire

Others
 Mohammad Aslam (politician) (born 1965), Indian politician
 Mohammad Aslam Bhutani (born 1960), Pakistani politician
 Mohammed Aslam, Indian playback singer and lyricist
 Sheikh Mohammad Aslam (born 1962), Bangladeshi footballer

See also
 Muhammad Aslam (disambiguation)